A number of horror films were released in 1980.

References

Sources

 

 
 
 
 
 
 
 

 
  

Lists of horror films by year
Horror